Rear Admiral Sir Jeremy Michael de Halpert,  (born 9 July 1947) is a former senior Royal Navy officer who served as Naval Secretary from 1998 until his retirement in 2002.

Naval career
Educated at Canford School and the Britannia Royal Naval College, de Halpert was commissioned as a sub-lieutenant in the Royal Navy in 1966. He was given command of the minesweeper HMS Sheraton in 1975 and served in the Falklands War on board the destroyer  in 1982. Promoted to commander in 1984, he took command of the frigate  before further promotion to captain in 1990 and command of the frigate .

De Halpert was appointed Chief of Staff to the Flag Officer, Surface Training at Portsmouth in 1992, Deputy UK National Military Representative to the Supreme Headquarters Allied Powers Europe in 1994 and Director of Overseas Military Activity at the Ministry of Defence in 1996 before taking up the post of Naval Secretary in 1998. He retired from military service in 2002.

Civic career
In retirement Sir Jeremy was appointed Deputy Master before becoming Executive Chairman of the Corporation of Trinity House, the charitable body responsible for running lighthouses and maintaining navigation buoys around the United Kingdom, as well as other maritime matters.

De Halpert is Prime Warden-elect of the Shipwrights' Company for 2016–17, supporting Lord Mayor The Lord Mountevans, the first Shipwright since Sir Frank Alexander was Lord Mayor of London (1944–45).

Family
Of Scottish descent, de Halpert is married to Jane née Fattorini (now styled Lady de Halpert).

References

External links
 Who's Who 2016 
 www.shipwrights.co.uk

1947 births
Living people
English people of Scottish descent
People educated at Canford School
Graduates of Britannia Royal Naval College
Royal Navy personnel of the Falklands War
Companions of the Order of the Bath
Knights Commander of the Royal Victorian Order
Royal Navy rear admirals